Mfoniso Udofia is a Nigerian-American storyteller, actor, and educator whose work centers on Nigerian immigrant life within the United States. Celebrated and well known work from Udofia includes: Sojourners, Her Portmanteau, runboyrun and In Old Age --- all plays from within her projected nine-play Ufot Cycle. She also works in film/television as a writer-producer on shows like Little America, Pachinko, A League of Their Own and Showtime's, Let the Right One In.

Early life and education 
In the 1970s, Udofia's parents immigrated from Nigeria to Houston, Texas, finally settling in Worcester, MA. Udofia went on to complete her undergraduate degree in political science from Wellesley College.

Udofia then went on to continue her education at the American Conservatory Theater. After graduating with her M.F.A in Acting Udofia moved to New York for work as an actress. Post-graduation, Udofia began writing plays that centered the Nigerian immigrant experience in America.

Work 
Upon completion of her Masters at the American Conservatory Theater, Udofia moved to New York City and began writing plays. The first play she wrote was The Grove, a play which would go on to become the second installation in a nine-play cycle entitled, The Ufot Cycle. The Ufot Cycle follows a Nigerian immigrant family across generations navigating their lives and identities in America. Her plays have had readings and/or productions at: New York Theatre Workshop, American Conservatory Theater, Magic Theater, The Playwrights Realm, Boston Court, Denver Center, Portland Center Stage, Berkeley Rep, The National Black Theater, Manhattan Theatre Club, MCC and McCarter Theatre. Her work has been developed at: Hedgebrook, Sundance Theatre Lab, Space on Ryder Farm, New Black Fest and more.

Outside of the cycle she has written a modern translation of Othello  for the PlayOn! Festival and compiled a night of her shorts, entitled On Love  for MCC. She's also written plays for both radio and the internet with her plays, The Human Experiment [radio], and New Math [Instagram].

In 2018 she began writing for television, starting as a staff writer for the 3rd season of Netflix's, 13 Reasons Why. She has gone on to write for over eight television shows.

Ufot Cycle Plays 
Only the four Ufot Cycle plays that have been produced have been listed.
 Sojourners
 runboyrun
 Her Portmanteau
 In Old Age

Awards/Honors

References 

Year of birth missing (living people)
Living people
People from Southbridge, Massachusetts
American people of Nigerian descent
Wellesley College alumni
Actors from Massachusetts